Edinburgh Comic Con is an annual fan convention organised by Hero Conventions and run at the Edinburgh International Conference Centre in Edinburgh, Scotland since 2014. It features guests from comics, film and television industries, and includes talks, displays and a prize cosplay competition.

In July 2015, the organisers announced an "Artist Searchlight" competition to design the cover for the 2016 programme.

Previous guests
The following guests from the world of comic books have been present at Edinburgh Comic Con:

 Jim Cheung (Press release via Comic Conventions)
 Gary Erskine
 Leonardo Manco
 Norm Breyfogle
 Declan Shalvey
 Jordie Bellaire
 Mike McKone
 Ivan Brandon
 Tanya Roberts
 Gordon Rennie
 Tom Foster
 Yishan Li
 Dan McDaid
 Simon Furman

The following guests from the world of TV & film have been present at Edinburgh Comic Con:

 Angus MacInnes (Star Wars, Judge Dredd, Space 1999)
 Simon Fisher-Becker (Doctor Who, Harry Potter)
 Jimmy Vee (Doctor Who)
 Spencer Wilding (Guardians of the Galaxy, Doctor Who, Batman Begins, Ghost Rider 2, Game of Thrones)
 Nathalie Cox (Star Wars: The Force Unleashed & The Force unleashed 2)
 Caitlin Blackwood (Doctor Who)

References

External links

Comics conventions
Conventions in the United Kingdom
Edinburgh
Multigenre conventions
Recurring events established in 2014
2014 establishments in Scotland